Callechelys maculatus is an eel in the family Ophichthidae (worm/snake eels). It was described by Chu Yuan-Ting, Wu Han-Lin and Jin Xin-Bo in 1981. It is a marine, temperate water-dwelling eel which is known from Pingtan Island, China, in the northwestern Pacific Ocean. Males can reach a maximum total length of 33.8 centimetres.

References

Ophichthidae
Taxa named by Chu Yuan-Ting 
Taxa named by Wu Han-Lin
Taxa named by Jin Xin-Bo
Fish described in 1981